Merely Mary Ann is a lost 1920 silent film comedy-drama directed by Edward J. Le Saint and starring Shirley Mason. It was produced and distributed by Fox Film Corporation.

Cast
Shirley Mason - Mary Ann
Casson Ferguson - Lancelot
Harry Spingler - Peter
Georgia Woodthorpe - Mrs. Leadbatter
Babe London - Rosie Leadbatter
Kewpie Morgan - Drunkard 
Jean Hersholt - Stranger 
Paul Weigel - Vicar

See also
1937 Fox vault fire
Merely Mary Ann(1916)
Merely Mary Ann(1931)

References

External links

Silent American comedy-drama films
1920 films
American silent feature films
American black-and-white films
Lost American films
Films directed by Edward LeSaint
American films based on plays
Fox Film films
1920 comedy-drama films
1920 lost films
Lost comedy-drama films
1920s American films
1920s English-language films